Lillie Mae Leatherwood (born July 6, 1964) is an American athlete who competed mainly in the 400 metres.

Biography
Leatherwood was born in Tuscaloosa, Alabama. Brought up in Ralph, she attended the University of Alabama, in the 1986 NCAA Indoor Track and Field Championships she captured the 400-m title with a 1st-place finish in an indoor collegiate record-setting time of 51.23s. She was also the National Champion in the 400-meter dash at the 1985 NCAA Indoor Track & Field Championships, with a time of 53.12 seconds.

Leatherwood competed for the United States in the 1984 Summer Olympics held in Los Angeles, U.S. in the 4 x 400 metres where she won the gold medal with her teammates Sherri Howard, Olympic 400 m champion Valerie Brisco-Hooks and 400 m silver medalist Chandra Cheeseborough.

Leatherwood became a member of Zeta Phi Beta sorority in 1986 through the Iota Eta chapter at the University of Alabama. She became married on November 20, 1986 to teammate & Olympian, Emmit King, and they are now divorced.  King was a member of Phi Beta Sigma. Leatherwood now resides in Tuscaloosa, Alabama, and is retired from her career with the Tuscaloosa City Police Department.

References

 

1964 births
Living people
Sportspeople from Tuscaloosa, Alabama
American female sprinters
Athletes (track and field) at the 1984 Summer Olympics
Athletes (track and field) at the 1988 Summer Olympics
Olympic gold medalists for the United States in track and field
World Athletics Championships medalists
Alabama Crimson Tide women's track and field athletes
Medalists at the 1988 Summer Olympics
Medalists at the 1984 Summer Olympics
Olympic silver medalists for the United States in track and field
Goodwill Games medalists in athletics
World Athletics Indoor Championships medalists
Competitors at the 1986 Goodwill Games
Competitors at the 1990 Goodwill Games
Olympic female sprinters